Kelly Sheridan is a Canadian voice actress best known for being the voice for Barbie in the Barbie film series from 2001 to 2010 and from 2012 to 2015. She had also voiced in numerous animations and English-language dubs of Japanese animations, including as Sango in the English dub of the Inuyasha, Diana Lombard in Martin Mystery, Theresa in Class of the Titans and Starlight Glimmer in My Little Pony: Friendship is Magic. She has been a member of Genus Theatre Company since August 2005.

Biography
Sheridan grew up in Vancouver and studied at the Vancouver Youth Theatre. She attended Simon Fraser University and graduated with a BFA degree in theatre in 2001.

Before Mobile Suit Gundam SEED Destiny came out in English, on many of the anime websites, Sheridan had mistakenly received credit for Stella Loussier's English voice. She was initially succeeded as the voice of Barbie by Diana Kaarina in 2010, beginning with Barbie: A Fashion Fairy Tale, but later returned to the role in 2012 in Barbie in A Mermaid Tale 2. She continued to voice Barbie through 2015, when it was announced that Erica Lindbeck would be taking over in 2016. Sheridan is married.

Filmography

Anime

Animation

Film

Feature films

Direct-to-video and television films

Video games

References

Book sources

External links

Living people
Actresses from Ottawa
Actresses from Vancouver
Canadian people of Irish descent
Canadian video game actresses
Canadian voice actresses
Mattel people
Simon Fraser University alumni
20th-century Canadian actresses
21st-century Canadian actresses
Year of birth missing (living people)